Raphael O'Hara Lanier (April 28, 1900 – December 17, 1962) was an American diplomat to Liberia.

Lanier was a member of Alpha Phi Alpha fraternity, the first inter-collegiate Greek letter organization established for African Americans.

Lanier was the first president of what is today Texas Southern University.

References

1900 births
1962 deaths
Ambassadors of the United States to Liberia
20th-century American diplomats